The Second Battle of Dover Strait was a naval battle of the First World War, fought in the Dover Strait in April 1917 and should not be confused with the major Battle of Dover Strait in 1916. Two Royal Navy destroyers defeated a superior force of German Kaiserliche Marine torpedo boats.  Two German torpedo boats were sunk; the British suffered damage to both destroyers.

Background
On 20 April 1917, two groups of torpedo boats of the German Navy raided the Dover Strait to bombard Allied positions on shore and to engage warships patrolling the Dover Barrage— the field of floating mines that prevented German ships from getting into the English Channel. Six torpedo boats bombarded Calais and another six bombarded Dover just before midnight.

Battle
Two flotilla leaders of the Royal Navy —  and  — were on patrol near Dover and engaged six of the German ships early on 21 April near the Goodwin Sands. In a confusing action, Swift torpedoed . Broke rammed , and the two ships became locked together. For a while, there was close-quarters fighting between the crews, as the German sailors tried to board the British ship, before Broke got free and G42 sank.

Aftermath
HMS Swift was slightly damaged, but Broke was heavily damaged and had to be towed back to port.

Notes

Bibliography
 Baldwin, H. W. World War I: An Outline History. New York: Harper and Row, 1962.
 Chatterton, E. K. The Auxiliary Patrol. London: Sidgwick and Jackson, 1923.
 Liddle, Peter H. The Sailor's War, 1914-1918. New York: Stirling, 1985.

North Sea operations of World War I
Naval battles of World War I involving Germany
Naval battles of World War I involving the United Kingdom
Conflicts in 1917
1910s in Kent
April 1917 events
Strait of Dover